Heřmanovice is a municipality and village in Bruntál District in the Moravian-Silesian Region of the Czech Republic. It has about 300 inhabitants.

History
The first written mention of Heřmanovice is from 1339.

From 1938 to 1945 it was annexed by Nazi Germany and administered as part of Reichsgau Sudetenland. After the World War II, most of the German population was expelled and the village depopulated.

References

Villages in Bruntál District